The Iceberg is a studio album by American hip hop artist Oddisee. It was released via Mello Music Group on February 24, 2017. It is the official follow-up to his 2015 album, The Good Fight. It features guest appearances from Toine and Olivier St. Louis. Music videos were created for "NNGE" and "You Grew Up".

Critical reception

At Metacritic, which assigns a weighted average score out of 100 to reviews from mainstream critics, the album received an average score of 82, based on 5 reviews, indicating "universal acclaim".

Riley Wallace of Exclaim! gave the album an 8 out of 10, saying, "One of his ultimate strengths is his unique ability to make topics that aren't wholly original become something unique and distinctively his own." Kyle Eustice of HipHopDX gave the album a 4.0 out of 5 and commented that "Aside from his dynamic, thought provoking lyrics, the carefully crafted compositions are in a league of their own." Elias Leight of Pitchfork gave the album a 7.0 out of 10 and described it as "a focused beam of hip-hop soul that rattles loudly in our present political moment."

Accolades

Track listing

Personnel
Credits adapted from liner notes.

 Oddisee – vocals, production, arrangement, mixing
 Toine – vocals (6)
 Olivier St. Louis – vocals (12), backing vocals, guitar
 Ralph Real – backing vocals, keyboards
 Dennis Turner – bass guitar
 Jason Disu – trombone
 Amir Mohamed – executive production
 Michael Tolle – executive production
 Daniel Luedtke – executive production
 Ahmed Akasha – design
 Antoine Lyers – photography

Charts

References

External links
 
 

2017 albums
Oddisee albums
Mello Music Group albums